Chrysocale ferens is a moth of the subfamily Arctiinae. It was described by Schaus in 1896. It is found in Bolivia and Peru.

References

Euchromiina
Moths described in 1896